Mount Sterling is an unincorporated community in Choctaw County, Alabama, United States. Mount Sterling was once a prosperous antebellum community, with an economy based on cotton and timber, but today little is left other than a few scattered houses. One church building, the Mount Sterling Methodist Church, is listed on the National Register of Historic Places.

Mount Sterling's population as an unincorporated community was listed as 126 at the 1880 U.S. Census, the only time a figure was returned.

Demographics

Geography

References

Unincorporated communities in Alabama
Unincorporated communities in Choctaw County, Alabama